220 Volt is a common mains electricity voltage. It may also refer to:
 220 Volt Live, an album by Tangerine Dream
 220 Volt (band)